Pseudopostega robusta is a moth of the family Opostegidae. It was described by Andrius Remeikis and Jonas R. Stonis in 2009. It is known from the Pacific Coast
of Costa Rica.

The wingspan is 5.9–6.2 mm for males. Adults have been recorded in March.

Etymology
The species name is derived from the Latin robusta (meaning stout) in reference to the large and strongly thickened gnathos in the male genitalia.

References

Opostegidae
Moths described in 2009